The 2022 Zagreb Ladies Open was a professional tennis tournament played on outdoor clay courts. It was the twelfth edition of the tournament which was part of the 2022 ITF Women's World Tennis Tour. It took place in Zagreb, Croatia between 25 April and 1 May 2022.

Singles main draw entrants

Seeds

 1 Rankings are as of 18 April 2022.

Other entrants
The following players received wildcards into the singles main draw:
  Lucija Ćirić Bagarić
  Petra Marčinko
  Lola Radivojević
  Donna Vekić

The following players received entry from the qualifying draw:
  Lea Bošković
  Živa Falkner
  Tena Lukas
  Eva Lys
  Ekaterina Makarova
  Nina Potočnik
  Antonia Ružić
  Tara Würth

Champions

Singles

  Jule Niemeier def.  Réka Luca Jani, 6–2, 6–2

Doubles

  Anastasia Dețiuc /  Katarina Zavatska def.  Lina Gjorcheska /  Irina Khromacheva, 6–4, 6–7(5–7), [11–9].

References

External links
 2022 Zagreb Ladies Open at ITFtennis.com
 Official website

2022 ITF Women's World Tennis Tour
2022 in Croatian sport
April 2022 sports events in Croatia
May 2022 sports events in Croatia